Greg Laurie (born December 10, 1952) is an American Evangelical author and pastor who serves as the senior pastor of Harvest Christian Fellowship, based in Riverside, California. He also is the founder of Harvest Crusades.

His book Jesus Revolution covers his experiences from the American spiritual awakening of the 1970s. The story of Laurie and his wife Cathe is depicted in the 2023 film Jesus Revolution, produced by Kingdom Story Company.

Early life and education
Greg Laurie was born in Long Beach, California. He was raised by a single mother who had seven marriages, often moving to vastly different locations such as New Jersey and Hawaii. Working as a newspaper delivery man for the Daily Pilot in Los Angeles, CA, was Greg Laurie's first job. Laurie was not raised in the Christian faith or a church environment. In 1970, when Laurie was 17 years old, he became a devout Christian at Newport Harbor High School under the ministry of evangelist Lonnie Frisbee, as the Jesus Movement was exploding in Southern California.

Ministry
In 1973, at the age of 20, under the ministry of Calvary Chapel pastor Chuck Smith, Laurie was given the opportunity to lead a Bible study of 30 people in Riverside, California. The church that formed from this group, Harvest Christian Fellowship, has grown to become one of the largest churches in the United States.

In 1990, Laurie founded the Harvest Crusades, an organization that hosts evangelistic events around the U.S.

He serves on the board of directors for the Billy Graham Evangelistic Association. He is also a chaplain for the Newport Beach Police Department. In 2013, Laurie served as the Honorary Chairman of the National Day of Prayer Task Force. President Donald Trump selected Pastor Laurie as one of several evangelical church leaders to participate in the National Prayer Service hosted at the Washington National Cathedral following the presidential inauguration of 2017.

In 2017, Greg Laurie organized a movement titled "The Year of Good News." Multiple church leaders signed the letter he penned to initiate the movement. One of the paragraphs of the letter reads, "In a time of fake news, distracting news, divisive news, disorderly news, and, sometimes, depressing news, we—as Christians and as leaders—want to recommit ourselves to making sure that the Good News of Jesus cuts through it all. We call upon Christians in America to make 2017 'The Year of Good News.'"

In 2017, his church became a member of the Southern Baptist Convention, after a request from Laurie, because of the SBC's programs of national and international evangelization.

Publishing and media
Laurie has written more than 70 books, including The Upside-Down Church (1999, co-authored with David Kopp); this book won a Gold Medallion Book Award in the "Christian ministry" category in 2000.

Laurie's sermons are featured on the syndicated half-hour daily program A New Beginning, which is broadcast on over 1,100 radio stations worldwide. A New Beginning is also featured as a Christian podcast available on iTunes. Laurie is also a guest commentator at WorldNetDaily and appears regularly in a weekly television program called GregLaurie.tv on the Trinity Broadcasting Network (TBN).

Films 
Greg Laurie has produced or written six films:

 Lost Boy 
 Hope for Hurting Hearts 
 A Rush of Hope 
 Steve McQueen: American Icon 
 Johnny Cash: The Redemption of an American Icon 
 Jesus Revolution (2023)

He is working on a seventh documentary, about fame and faith.

Personal life
Laurie resides in Newport Beach with his wife, Catherine. The couple had two sons, Christopher and Jonathan, as well as five grandchildren. On July 24, 2008, Christopher was killed at the scene of a 9 a.m. car accident on the eastbound Riverside Freeway west of Serfas Club Drive in Corona, California. He was 33 years old.

Recognition
Laurie holds two honorary doctorates, from Biola University and from Azusa Pacific University.

Publications

Johnny Cash: The Redemption of An American Icon. Terrill Marshall. Washington, DC: Salem Books. 2019. . 
World Changers: How God Uses Ordinary People to do Extraordinary Things. Larry Libby. Grand Rapids, Michigan: Baker Books, a division of Baker Publishing Group. 2020. .
Lennon, Dylan, Alice and Jesus. 2022.

References

External links
 Harvest.org
 Harvest Christian Fellowship
 Greg Laurie bio
 Greg Laurie - Christian Comics Pioneer
 Article: Harvest America: Christians Celebrate Changed Lives at History-Making Event
 Harvest Crusades: New app for nationwide event

1952 births
Living people
American anti-abortion activists
American Protestant ministers and clergy
American Christian creationists
American Christian writers
Conservatism in the United States
People from Long Beach, California
Newport Harbor High School alumni